John Patrick Butcher (13 February 1946 – 25 December 2006) was a Conservative Party politician in the United Kingdom.

Butcher was born in Doncaster but grew up in Huntingdonshire where he was educated at Huntingdon Grammar School and the University of Birmingham. He fought the seat of Birmingham Northfield in February 1974 and was a Birmingham City Councillor from 1972 until 1978.

He was Member of Parliament (MP) for Coventry South West from 1979 until 1997, when the seat was abolished by boundary changes. In business he became chairman of Texas Instruments and the Institute of Directors (1997–2001).

He was married with three children, including Jessica Butcher, and despite living in Solihull was a common sight at the Carlton Club in London.

Westminster
Following his election in 1979, Butcher was appointed PPS to Leon Brittan in 1981 and became a Parliamentary Under-Secretary in 1982 at the Department of Trade. Butcher also served as Parliamentary Under-Secretary for Education and Science between 1988 and 1989, after being moved from what was then called the Department of Trade and Industry.

During his time as minister at the Department of Trade and Industry during the eighties he deregulated the mobile telephone market in the UK.

After he left ministerial office he introduced the Property Misdescriptions Act, which aimed to curb "the more extravagant claims of estate agents".  He was also a euro-sceptic and was one of the Maastricht Rebels who voted against the Government in 1993.

After politics
When he left politics due to heart problems, which would eventually take his life, he became chairman of Texas Instruments (1990-98) and the Institute of Directors (1997-2001). In 1997, he became a director of Pertemps Group and two years later became a director of Phoenic Telecom. He even ran his own company, John Butcher Associates in the West Midlands.

He died of heart failure at the age of 60, on Christmas Day 2006, at 1500 feet, beside Alcock Tarn in the Lake District with his three children.

The initial John Butcher Memorial Lecture was held at University of Warwick on 19 March 2008. The first guest speaker was Michael Howard QC MP.

Notes

References
Obituary, The Times, 5 January 2007

External links

1946 births
2006 deaths
People from Doncaster
Alumni of the University of Birmingham
Councillors in Birmingham, West Midlands
Conservative Party (UK) MPs for English constituencies
UK MPs 1979–1983
UK MPs 1983–1987
UK MPs 1987–1992
UK MPs 1992–1997
British Eurosceptics